The term chevra kadisha (Modern Hebrew: חֶבְרָה קַדִּישָׁא) gained its modern sense of "burial society" in the nineteenth century. It is an organization of Jewish men and women who see to it that the bodies of deceased Jews are prepared for burial according to Jewish tradition and are protected from desecration, willful or not, until burial. Two of the main requirements are the showing of proper respect for a corpse, and the ritual cleansing of the body and subsequent dressing for burial. It is usually referred to as a burial society in English.

History
Throughout Jewish history, each Jewish community throughout the world has established a chevra kadisha – a holy society – whose sole function is to ensure dignified treatment of the deceased in accordance with Jewish law, custom, and tradition. Men prepare the bodies of men, ladies prepare those of ladies.

At the heart of the society's function is the ritual of tahara, or purification. The body is first thoroughly cleansed of dirt, bodily fluids and solids, and anything else that may be on the skin, and then is ritually purified by immersion in, or a continuous flow of, water from the head over the entire body.  Tahara may refer to either the entire process, or to the ritual purification. Once the body is purified, the body is dressed in tachrichim, or shrouds, of  white pure muslin or linen garments made up of ten pieces for a male and twelve for a female, which are identical for each Jew and which symbolically recalls the garments worn by the Kohen Gadol (High Priest). Once the body is shrouded, the casket is closed. For burial in Israel, however, a casket is not used in most cemeteries.

The society may also provide shomrim, or watchers, to guard the body from theft, vermin, or desecration until burial. In some communities this is done by people close to the departed or by paid shomrim hired by the funeral home. At one time, the danger of theft of the body was very real; in modern times the watch has become a way of honoring the deceased.

A specific task of the burial society is tending to the dead who have no next-of-kin. These are termed a meit mitzvah (Hebrew: , a mitzvah corpse), as tending to a meit mitzvah overrides virtually any other positive commandment (mitzvat aseh) of Torah law, an indication of the high premium the Torah places on the honor of the dead.

Many burial societies hold one or two annual fast days and organise regular study sessions to remain up-to-date with the relevant articles of Jewish law. In addition, most burial societies also support families during the shiv'ah (traditional week of mourning) by arranging prayer services, meals and other facilities.

While burial societies were, in Europe, generally a community function, in the United States it has become far more common for societies to be organized by neighborhood synagogues. In the late 19th and early 20th century, chevra kadisha societies were formed as landsmanshaft fraternal societies in the United States. Some landsmanshaftn were burial societies while others were "independent" groups split off from the chevras. There were 20,000 such landsmanshaftn in the U.S. at one time.

Recordkeeping
The chevra kadisha of communities in pre-World War II Europe maintained Pinkas Klali D’Chevra Kadisha (translation: general notebook of the Chevra Kadisha); some were handwritten in Yiddish, others in Hebrew.

Etymology
In Hebrew the word can be written חבורה קדושה ("sacred society") while in Aramaic: חבורתא קדישתא. Modern Hebrew "chevra" (chiefly Ashkenazic) is of unclear etymology. The Aramaic phrase is first attested in Yekum Purkan, in a 13th-century copy of Machzor Vitry, but it was rarely used again in print until it gained its modern sense of "burial society" in the nineteenth century. The Hebrew phrase predated it in modern popularity by some decades. Probably the Modern Hebrew phrase is a phonetic transliteration of the Ashkenazic pronunciation of Heb. חבורה קדושה chevra qadisha which has been misinterpreted as an Aramaic phrase and therefore spelled with a yodh and aleph.

This auspicious title exists because performing a favor for someone who is dead is considered the ultimate act of kindness – as a dead person can never repay the kindness, making it devoid of ulterior motives.

See also
 Asra Kadisha
 Chesed Shel Emes
 Chevra Kaddisha Cemetery, Sacramento
 Hebrew Free Burial Association
 Landsmanshaft
 Misaskim
 ZAKA

References

Further reading
 A Plain Pine Box: A Return to Simple Jewish Funerals and Eternal Traditions, Rabbi Arnold M. Goodman, 1981, 2003, KTAV Publishing House, .
 Tahara Manual of Practices including Halacha Decisions of Hagaon Harav Moshe Feinstein, zt'l, Rabbi Mosha Epstein, 1995, 2000, 2005.

External links

 Chesed Shel Emes Website
 Chevra Kadisha Mortuary
 Kavod v'Nichum: Jewish Funerals, Burial, and Mourning
 KavodHameis.org – Chevra Kadisha Training Videos
 Chevra Kadisha of Florida: A Division of Chabad of North Dade
 My Jewish Learning: Chevra Kadisha, or Jewish Burial Society
 National Association of Chevra Kadisha Official Website

Aramaic words and phrases
Aramaic words and phrases in Jewish law
Aramaic words and phrases in Jewish prayers and blessings
Bereavement in Judaism
Jewish community organizations
Jewish life cycle
Mutual organizations